The Taraggi Medal ("Progress Medal") – is the state award of Azerbaijan Republic. The award was created by Heydar Aliyev, the President of the Republic of Azerbaijan, on December 6, 1993 by the Decree No. 758.

Status
The Taraggi Medal is given to:
 Citizens of Azerbaijan Republic
 Foreign nationals and non-citizens of Azerbaijan Republic
 People without citizenship

The medal is given to distinguished persons for the following services:
 Special contributions in the sphere of industry and agriculture;
 Revelation and innovatory proposals of the great importance;
 Special contributions in the sphere of science, culture, literature, arts, public education and health;
 Special contributions on building and reconstruction of agricultural objects;
 Productive activity in development of physical culture and sport.

The medal also was given for particular merits. For example, from July 4, 2011 the medal was given to several persons in the sphere of development of Azerbaijani diaspora by Ilham Aliyev, the President of Azerbaijan Republic.

The Taraggi medal is pinned to the left side of the chest and if there are other medals or orders of Azerbaijan Republic the Taraggi medal is followed Medal for Courage.

Description
The Taraggi Medal is made of brass metal in the form of oval and sharp-edged salient ornament with sizes of 51 mm along vertical line and 48 mm along horizontal line. There is a 51 mm diameter circle in the centre of the ornament framed with decorated stripe of 2,5 mm width, a stripe with curved endings on which is a relief inscription Taraggi, a bud like a branched tree against the background of the radiant Sun. And there is a seven edged star on the top. There are pictures of a crescent and eight-edged star on the rear top side of the medal. There is a stretched hexagon in the bottom for writing the awarding date. The medal is bordered with a salient ledge. All inscriptions and pictures are salient. With the help of eye ring the medal is attached to a tetragonal block. The block consists of 2 ornamented parts concatenated with moiré ribbon of brown color. The left top and bottom edges of the ribbon are olive and are intersected by golden lines of 1 mm width. The whole width of the ribbon is 19 mm. Size of the block is 46 mm x 22 mm.

Recipients
 Leyla Aliyeva – chief editor of "Baku" magazine, chair of Russian department of the Heydar Aliyev Foundation
 Anar Baghirov – lawyer, chairman of the Azerbaijan Bar Association
 Israfil Ashurlu – alpinist, president of Alpinism Federation of Azerbaijan
 Fazil Hasanov – chair of Azerbaijanis' Cultural Center
 Tale Heydarov – chair of European-Azerbaijani Society
 Namig Mamedov  – professor of Russian Academy of Sciences
 Erich Feigl – Austrian] writer, journalist, documentary film-maker and film producer
 Rahid Alekberli – chief technical officer of Delta Telecom
 Ilgar Nazarov
 Ramin Isayev
 Elchin Safaraly-oghlu Babayev
 Enes Cansever – Zaman Daily editor-in-chief
  Iskandar Shirali – the head of Integrated Drilling Trust of the State Oil Company of Azerbaijan Republic (SOCAR)
 Said Irandoust 
 Seven representatives from the Azerbaijan Red Crescent Society
 Azerbaijan National Agency for Mine Action
 Medical workers.
 Employees of Azerbaijan National Library
 Education workers of the Ganja State University
 Teymur Hajiyev
 Huseyn Gasimov – former head of finance, BP Azerbaijan 2009
German Zaharyaev – Azerbaijani born Russian billionaire
Pasha Kerimov – doctor of philology sciences, deputy director of ANAS Institute of Manuscripts
 Rashad Nabiyev – chair of the board and chief executive officer of Azercosmos.
 Mushfig Guluyev – Ministry of Digital Development and Transport of the Republic of Azerbaijan.
Namig Mammadov – Azerbaijani public figure, businessman and maecenas.
Shakir Hasanov – Azerbaijani engineer
Gulshan Aliyeva-Kengerli – professor

References 

Orders, decorations, and medals of Azerbaijan
Awards established in 1993
1993 establishments in Azerbaijan
Recipients of the Taraggi